Konsole is a free and open-source terminal emulator graphical application which is part of KDE Applications and ships with the KDE desktop environment. Konsole was originally written by Lars Doelle. It ls licensed under the GPL-2.0-or-later and the GNU Free Documentation License.

KDE applications, including Dolphin, Kate, KDevelop, Kile, Konversation, Konqueror, and Krusader, use Konsole to provide embedded terminal functionality via Kpart.

Features 

 Built-in support for bi-directional text display.
 Tabbed terminals. Tab titles update dynamically depending on the current activity in the terminal.
 Translucent backgrounds
 Split-view mode
 Directory and SSH bookmarking
 Customizable color schemes
 Customizable key bindings
 Notifications about silence or activity in a terminal
 Incremental search
 Can open Dolphin or the user's preferred file manager at the terminal program's current directory
 Export of output in plain text or HTML format
Multiple profile support
Text reflow

Internals 
Up to the KDE 4.0, Konsole internal functionality was split into a backend and frontend parts. The backed was represented by a terminal emulator (the DEC VT102 + xterm emulation program) and the frontend that included terminal display and user interface used to display output characters on a window screen or a printer.

With newer versions Konsole on Linux systems uses PTY (pseudoterminal interface) abstraction implemented by KPty KDE framework introduced in 2014.

Gallery

See also

 List of terminal emulators
KDE
List of KDE applications
KDE Plasma 5
KDE neon
KDE Frameworks
Bash (Unix shell)
Dolphin (file manager)
KDevelop

Notes

External links 

Free terminal emulators
KDE Applications
Terminal emulator software that uses Qt